Stephan Ripke is a German statistical geneticist and Research Scientist in the Analytic and Translational Genetics Unit at Massachusetts General Hospital. He is also affiliated with the Broad Institute. He is a leader of the Statistical Analysis Group of the Psychiatric Genomics Consortium. He earned his Ph.D. cum laude from Utrecht University in 2014. He received the Sidney R. Baer, Jr., Prize for Innovative and Promising Schizophrenia Research from the Brain & Behavior Research Foundation in 2014, and was awarded a Young Investigator Grant from them in 2015.

Since April 2018 Stephan Ripke is leading the GWAS Research Unit (GResU) as a Heisenberg Professor at the department for Psychiatry and Psychotherapy at Charité Mitte in Berlin, Germany.

References

External links
Profile at the Brain & Behavior Research Foundation

Living people
Statistical geneticists
Utrecht University alumni
Massachusetts General Hospital faculty
German statisticians
German geneticists
German emigrants to the United States
Schizophrenia researchers
University of Hamburg alumni
Medical schools in Germany
1973 births